Warren Trotter (born July 21, 1980), professionally known as Really Doe, is an American rapper and songwriter from Chicago, Illinois. He was signed to Kanye West's record label GOOD Music from 2004 to 2008. He released his debut studio album First Impressions in 2009, through Cartel Records. He was also a part of the hip hop group The Go Getters with rappers Kanye West and GLC formed in 1996.

Career
Really Doe, a Grammy Award-winning songwriter, signed with Kanye West's G.O.O.D. Music label in 2005. He became one-third of the group The Go Getters, formed by Kanye West and label mate GLC.

Really Doe made a guest appearance on Kanye West's “We Major” (featuring Nas) and Consequence’s “Disperse” (Featuring GLC.)

Really Doe signed with Cartel Records in 2009. Working with music producer Griffin Guess, he composed the single “Plastic”, featuring Kanye West available on iTunes. He performed the song with Kanye West at Fader Magazine’s FORT in Austin Texas.

Really Doe’s first album, “First Impressions”, released on August 18, 2009, addresses a litany of topics that range from personal struggles of growing up in Chicago, to the current political landscape and all that falls in between. Kanye West and up and coming producer Jaye Jeffers are featured on the album. Really Doe undertook a multi-city tour with Latin hip-hop duo, Wisin Y Yandel, in California and Texas. Really Doe has also had write-ups in XXL as well as GIANT Magazine. Really Doe took to the Jimmy Kimmel Live! stage in January 2010, and followed that with a performance on The Mo'Nique Show in that same month.

Discography

Studio albums

Guest appearances

References

External links
 

1980 births
African-American male rappers
Grammy Award winners for rap music
Living people
Rappers from Chicago
Songwriters from Illinois
21st-century American rappers
21st-century American male musicians
African-American songwriters
21st-century African-American musicians
20th-century African-American people
American male songwriters